Aponeurotic fibroma (also known as "Calcifying aponeurotic fibroma," and "Juvenile aponeurotic fibroma") is characterized by a lesion that usually presents as a painless, solitary, deep fibrous nodule, often adherent to tendon, fascia, or periosteum, on the hands and feet. The World Health Organization, 2020, reclassified aponeurotic fibroma nodules as a specific benign type of the fibroblastic and myofibroblastic tumors.

See also
Skin lesion

References

Dermal and subcutaneous growths